The Jack S. Blanton Museum of Art (often referred to as the Blanton or the BMA) at the University of Texas at Austin is one of the largest university art museums in the U.S. with 189,340 square feet devoted to temporary exhibitions, permanent collection galleries, storage, administrative offices, classrooms, a print study room, an auditorium, shop, and cafe.  The Blanton's permanent collection consists of more than 21,000 works, with significant holdings of modern and contemporary art, Latin American art, Old Master paintings, and prints and drawings from Europe, the United States, and Latin America.

History
The museum was founded in 1963 as the University Art Museum on the campus of the University of Texas at Austin. The University Art Museum was initially housed in the Art Department of the University of Texas (though supervision of the museum was later moved to the Office of the Provost) and was founded through the proceeds from the sale of land donated by Archer M. Huntington. This land was donated with the stipulation that it be used to support an art museum at the university. In 1964, Donald Goodall became the museum's first director.

By 1972, a portion of the museum's collection was housed at the Harry Ransom Humanities Center, while the print study room and temporary exhibition galleries remained at the Art Department. In 1979, Eric S. McCready became the museum's second director, and the museum was renamed the Archer M. Huntington Art Gallery shortly thereafter.

In 1993, Jessie Otto Hite became the museum's third director. In 1994, Mari Yoriko Sabusawa, wife of novelist James Michener, gifted $5 million for the construction of a new museum complex, which would be the first dedicated space for the museum's permanent collection since its founding. The campaign to build a new building began in 1997 with a $12 million gift from the Houston Endowment, Inc. in honor of its then-chairman, Jack S. Blanton. The museum was renamed the Blanton Museum of Art, with construction on the new building commencing in 2003.

Although the museum was built as designed by Kallmann McKinnell & Wood Architects, they were not the first architectural firm hired for the project. The notable Swiss-based architectural firm Herzog & de Meuron had originally been commissioned for the project, but resigned the commission in 1999 due to differences in their design and the wishes of the Board of Regents regarding the university's Campus Master Plan. Lawrence Speck, disappointed in the series of events that led to Herzog & de Meuron's resignation, resigned as dean of the School of Architecture, although he remains a faculty member.

The new gallery building, named the Mari and James A. Michener Gallery Building, opened to the public with a 24-hour marathon celebration in 2006.  A second education and administration building (the Edgar A. Smith Building), totaling 56,000 square feet, opened in 2008. In 2009, Ned Rifkin was named to replace the retiring Jessie Otto Hite as director. In 2011, Simone Wicha was named director.

The Blanton Museum is currently preparing for a major exterior transformation of its grounds and plaza designed by Snøhetta. That effort was significantly aided by the surprise announcement, at a February 2019 gala by museum director Simone Wicha, that the museum would receive a $20 million gift from The Moody Foundation, to fund the project and continued free admission on Thursdays.

Collections
The Blanton's permanent collection of more than 21,000 works is recognized for its European paintings, prints and drawings, and modern and contemporary American and Latin American art.

European art before 1900
The collection of European paintings, sculpture, and decorative arts before 1900 includes the Suida-Manning Collection of over 275 works, with paintings by Parmigianino, Paolo Veronese, Tiepolo, Rubens, Claude Lorrain, and Simon Vouet, along with many other European artists from the 15th through 18th centuries. The collection also includes works by lesser-known, but still historically significant, painters such as Daniele Crespi and Luca Cambiaso. While the Suida-Manning Collection predominantly showcases Italian and French artists, eighteenth-century English painting is represented by a group of portraits bequeathed by Jack G. Taylor, including George Romney's Lady Hamilton (1791).

The Blanton owns a collection of Greek, Etruscan, and Roman vases, the earliest of which date to the sixth century BCE. Many came from the Castle Ashby Collection formed by the Spencer Compton, 2nd Marquess of Northampton, who funded numerous excavations at Vulci, an Etruscan town north of Rome, during the 1820s.

Modern and contemporary art

The Blanton's modern and contemporary art holdings comprise more than 4,000 objects. Novelist James Michener, and his wife, Mari Michener, began giving their collection of 20th-century American paintings to the Blanton in the 1960s. The gift spanned into the early 1990s and eventually totaled more than 300 works. The Micheners also gave acquisition funds to the museum, supporting the purchase of approximately 75 additional paintings.

The museum's collection includes 20th-century artists such as Thomas Hart Benton, Alice Neel, and Brice Marden. The Blanton's collection of contemporary art also includes works by El Anatsui, Teresa Hubbard / Alexander Birchler, Natalie Frank, Nina Katchadourian, Byron Kim, Yayoi Kusama, Glenn Ligon, Donald Moffett, Susan Philipsz, and Tavares Strachan. In 2009, Stacked Waters, an installation by artist Teresita Fernández commissioned by Jeanne and Michael Klein, debuted in the Rapoport Atrium of the Blanton Museum. In 2014, the Blanton acquired an important group of drawings, prints, and a major painting by the African-American artist Charles White from Drs. Susan G. and Edmund W. Gordon.

Latin American art

Shortly after his appointment as founding director of the University of Texas Art Museum in Austin in 1959, Donald Goodall acquired for the Blanton what was at that time the largest collection of Latin American art in the United States.  The Latin American collection expanded significantly in the 1970s and 1980s with gifts from collector Barbara Duncan of 277 works of art, including 58 paintings and 112 drawings. The museum was the first institution in the United States to create a curatorial position for Latin American art in 1988.  The founding curator of the department was Mari Carmen Ramírez who acquired one of the signature works in the Latin American collection, Cildo Meireles' Missão/Missões:  How to Build Cathedrals (1987).  The museum received a notable addition of Latin American modern and midcentury Latin American art from collectors Judy and Charles Tate in 2015. The 114-object collection includes paintings, sculptures, and drawings by Diego Rivera, José Clemente Orozco, Tarsila do Amaral, Rufino Tamayo, Joaquín Torres García, Wifredo Lam, Armando Reveron, Jesus Rafael Soto, and Lygia Clark, among others.

The Julia Matthews Wilkinson Center for Prints and Drawings

The Julia Matthews Wilkinson Center for Prints and Drawings houses most of the Blanton's 16,000 works on paper. The center also includes the H.E.B. print study room, a library, and curatorial offices. The center's holdings reflect the Blanton's fifty-year focus on three specific collecting areas: European art from 1450 to 1800, Latin American art after 1960, and American art of the 20th century.

The Wilkinson Center's holdings include over 380 drawings from the Suida-Manning Collection, which are mostly pre-1800 Italian, including drawings by Raphael, Correggio, and Guercino. Also representing European art from this period is the Leo Steinberg Collection of almost 3,500 prints, including early impressions by Hendrick Goltzius, Claude Lorrain, and Giovanni Benedetto Castiglione. The center's holdings in contemporary Latin American art feature several thousand works from eighteen Latin American countries and includes 230 works on paper from the Barbara Duncan Collection of Latin American Art. Prints and drawings by American artists since 1900 comprise about twenty-five percent of the Blanton's holdings on paper. Julia and Stephen Wilkinson and their Still Water Foundation gave over 1030 prints, primarily wood engravings from the first half of the 20th century tied to the tradition of social realism. Among them are 757 prints by Clare Leighton, best known for her images of rural workers.

Western American art
The C.R. Smith Collection of Western American Art is a collection of 91 works given to the Blanton between 1968 and 1988. The collection includes works by Oscar E. Berninghaus, Albert Bierstadt, Solon H. Borglum, Dean Cornwell, Maynard Dixon, Henry Farny, Thomas Hill, Ransome Gillett Holdridge, Peter Hurd, Frank Tenney Johnson, Tom Lea, William Robinson Leigh, Alfred Jacob Miller, and Thomas Moran.

Ellsworth Kelly's Austin

In January 2015, the artist Ellsworth Kelly gave the Blanton the design concept for a  stone building that he subsequently named Austin. This work of art relates to the tradition of modernist artist-commissioned buildings that includes Rothko Chapel and Henri Matisse's Matisse Chapel. Kelly said that the design of the building was inspired by Romanesque and Byzantine art he studied while in Paris on the G.I. Bill. Following Kelly's gift, the Blanton launched a $15 million campaign to realize the project. Austin opened February 18, 2018, with a ceremony featuring University of Texas at Austin President Greg Fenves, Austin Mayor Steve Adler, and museum director Simone Wicha.

SoundSpace 
SoundSpace is a hybrid performance series that takes place at the Blanton three times per year. The series features simultaneous, interdisciplinary performances throughout the museum and has received awards from the Austin Critic's Table, the Austin Chronicle, and profiled at the annual SXSW Festival. SoundSpace has featured Graham Reynolds, Adrian Quesada, Thor Harris, and Panoramic Voices, among others. The series is directed by Austin artist Steve Parker and underwritten by local arts patron Mike Chesser.

References

External links

Blanton Museum of Art within Google Arts & Culture

Art museums established in 1963
Art museums and galleries in Texas
University museums in Texas
University of Texas at Austin
Museums in Austin, Texas
Institutions accredited by the American Alliance of Museums
University of Texas at Austin campus
1963 establishments in Texas
Museums of American art
Plaster cast collections
University and college buildings completed in 1963